Sunderland Ridge is an industrial township of Centurion, Gauteng, South Africa.

References

Suburbs of Centurion, Gauteng